Adolf Winkelmann may refer to:

Adolf Winkelmann (physician) (1887–1947), German physician of the Ravensbrück Nazi concentration camp, see Hamburg Ravensbrück Trials
Adolf Winkelmann (film director) (born 1946), German film director, producer and screenwriter